John Kirkpatrick (born 3 January 1979) is an English former rugby union and professional rugby league footballer who played in the 1990s and 2000s.

Background
John Kirkpatrick was born in Preston, Lancashire, England, he has Scottish ancestors, and eligible to play for Scotland due to the grandparent rule.

Playing career
John Kirkpatrick was called into the Scotland (RL) squad in 2006.

References

External links
Profile at saints.org.uk
(archived by web.archive.org) SL Stats
Statistics at rugby.widnes.tv

1979 births
Living people
English people of Scottish descent
English rugby league players
English rugby union players
Halifax R.L.F.C. players
London Broncos players
Preston Grasshoppers R.F.C. players
Rugby league fullbacks
Rugby league wingers
Rugby league players from Preston, Lancashire
Rugby union players from Preston, Lancashire
St Helens R.F.C. players
Widnes Vikings players